Bobby Donald Bolin  (born January 29, 1939) is an American former professional baseball pitcher who appeared 495 games in Major League Baseball over 13 seasons (1961–1973) for the San Francisco Giants (–), Milwaukee Brewers and Boston Red Sox (1970–).

He entered pro ball after signing with the New York Giants on November 10, 1956, at the age of 17 out of Rock Hill High School. He spent four seasons moving up through the Giants' farm system until making the San Francisco roster in the spring of 1961.

He reached double figures in victories four times, and in strikeouts six times, as a Giant. In 1968, Bolin had the second-best earned run average (ERA) in the National League, 1.99, behind only Bob Gibson's record-setting mark of 1.12. Bolin finished in the NL's top ten three times for ERA, WHIP, and hit batsmen, and twice for shutouts, strikeouts per nine innings pitched, winning percentage and bases on balls allowed.

In all, he pitched in 495 MLB games (164 starts), with 32 complete games, ten shutouts and 161 games finished. He posted a career won–lost mark of 88–75, with 50 saves and an ERA of 3.40, permitting 1,387 hits and 597 bases on balls (along with 1,175 strikeouts) in 1,576 innings pitched. As a member of the  National League champion Giants (for whom Bolin went 7–3 with six saves), he appeared in two games of the 1962 World Series against the New York Yankees, allowing four hits and two earned runs in 2 innings pitched.

References

External links

Historic Baseball
Stolzenbach, Corey, Bobby Bolin, Society for American Baseball Research Biography Project

1939 births
Living people
Baseball players from South Carolina
Boston Red Sox players
Eugene Emeralds players
Louisville Colonels (minor league) players
Major League Baseball pitchers
Michigan City White Caps players
Milwaukee Brewers players
People from York County, South Carolina
Rio Grande Valley Giants players
Rock Hill High School (South Carolina) alumni
St. Cloud Rox players
San Francisco Giants players
Tacoma Giants players